Benjamin Hitchings Jr. (January 12, 1813 – January 13, 1893) was an American shoe manufacturer and politician who served one term in the Massachusetts House of Representatives.

Hitchings was born on January 12, 1813, in Lynn, Massachusetts to Benjamin and Jane Hitchings. The Hitchings family soon moved to Saugus, Massachusetts, where Benjamin Hitchings Sr. started a shoe manufacturing business. On September 6, 1840, Hitchings married Esther C. Carlton. They had two daughters. In 1841, Hitchings represented Saugus in the Massachusetts House of Representatives. Hitchings died on January 13, 1893.

References

1813 births
1893 deaths
Members of the Massachusetts House of Representatives
People from Saugus, Massachusetts
Shoemakers